Hammersonic Festival is a metal and rock festival, held annually in Jakarta, Indonesia since 2012.

Lineups

2012 
 Suffocation 
 DRI  
 Nile  
 Agnostic Front  
 Cthonic 
 Burgerkill 
 Deadsquad 
 Sucker Head
 Death Vomit
 Noxa
 Seringai
 Funeral Inception
 Straight Out
 Death Vertical
 Down for Life
 Massacre Conspiracy 
 The Arson Project
 Dawn Heist
 Koil
 GxSxD
 Impiety
 Nothnegal
 Divine Codex
 Cyanide Serenity
 Dreamer
 Psycroptic
 And More

2013 
 Cradle of Filth 
 As I Lay Dying  
 Cannibal Corpse  
 Epica 
 Destruction  
 Lock up 
 Dying Fetus  
 Gorod 
 Hour of Penence  
 Putrit Pile  
 Burgerkill ,
 Rising The Fall
 Gorod 
 Kraken
 Kapital
 Rezume
 Unremains
 Belligerent Intent
 Sil Khannaz
 Ethereal Sin
 Down For Life
 Revenge
 Outright
 Whoretopsy
 Hellcrust
 Inanimacy
 Advent Sorrow
 Dead Vertical
 Sensory Amusia
 Ouroboros
 Edane
 Sucker Head
 The Amenta
 Power Metal
 Seringai
 Voyager
 Saturnian
 Dyscarnate
 Obituary
 And More

2014 
 Bullet for My Valentine  
 Kreator  
 Hatebreed 
 Morbid Angel 
 Fleshgod Apocalypse 
 Origin  
 Belphegor 
 Burgerkill 
 And Many More

2015 
 Lamb Of God 
 Unearth  
 Ignite 
 Terrorizer 
 Mayhem 
 Avulsed 
 Vader 
 Warbringer 
 Deathstar 
 The Faceless 
 And Many More

2016 
 Asking Alexandria 
 Angra 
 Drowning Pool 
 Gorgoroth 
 Darkest Hour 
 Rise of The Northstar 
 Internal Bleeding 
 Suffocation 
 Burgerkill 
 Obscura 
 Onslaught
 And Many More

2017 
 Megadeth 
 Tarja 
 Abbath 
 Entombed AD 
 The Black Dahlia Murder 
 Whitechapel 
 Krisiun 
 I See Stars 
 Earth Crisis 
 Northlane
 The Faceless 
 Putrid Pile 
 Burgerkill
 And Many More

2018 
 In Flames  
 Dead Kennedys 
 Ihsahn 
 Escape the Fate 
 H20 
 Brujeria 
 Wind of Plagues 
 Visceral Disgorge 
 Revocation 
 Vital Remains 
 And Many more

External links

Heavy metal festivals in Indonesia
Tourist attractions in Jakarta
Tourist attractions in Indonesia
Events in Jakarta